Alice Nicole Kinsella (born 13 March 2001) is an Irish-English artistic gymnast and member of the British national gymnastics team. She represented Great Britain at the 2020 Summer Olympics and won a bronze medal in the team event, and was part of the Great Britain team that achieved a highest ever silver medal position in the same event at the 2022 World Artistic Gymnastics Championships. Individually, she is the 2018 Commonwealth Games and 2019 European champion on the balance beam, and the 2022 Commonwealth Games champion on floor. Kinsella won a third Commonwealth Games title as part of England's gold-winning team all-around squad of 2022.

Early career
Kinsella first started gymnastics at Tamworth Olympic Gymnastics Club. She then moved to Park Wrekin Gymnastics Club in Wellington, Shropshire and has continued training there since.

Senior career

2017
Her senior debut came in March 2017 where she finished seventh in the 2017 Stuttgart World Cup.

She competed at the 2017 European Artistic Gymnastics Championships in Cluj-Napoca, Romania where she placed tenth in the all-around.

In October 2017, Alice was chosen to represent Great Britain at the 2017 Artistic Gymnastics World Championships in Montreal, Quebec, Canada. She competed in the all-around in qualifications and placed twenty-fourth overall, qualifying her to the all-around final with a score of 51.365.

On 6 October 2017, British Gymnastics announced that Alice had withdrawn from the all-around final after sustaining a minor ankle injury during qualifications.

2018 
On 10 February, Alice competed at the English Championships where she placed seventh in the all-around. She also placed fourth on vault and bars and sixth on floor.  On 21 February, Alice was named to the English team for the 2018 Commonwealth Games in Gold Coast, Australia.

In March, Alice competed at the British Championships. She competed in the all-around where she placed fifth with a score of 51.650. She then competed in the beam final where she won a silver medal with a score of 13.350 and also in the floor final where she placed fifth with a score of 13.000. Later on that month, Alice was chosen to compete at the Artistic Gymnastics World Cup in Birmingham to replace teammate Claudia Fragapane who had to withdraw due to injury. She won the bronze medal with a total score of 53.099 behind Russia's Angelina Melnikova and American Margzetta Frazier.

In April Kinsella competed at the Commonwealth Games on all four events in the team final/individual qualifications where she won a silver medal with the English team, finishing behind Canada. She had also qualified in third for the all-around final, second for the beam final and sixth for the floor final. In the all-around final, Alice won bronze with a total score of 53.150 behind gold medal winner Ellie Black from Canada and silver medal winner Georgia Godwin from Australia. Alice competed in the beam final where she won gold with a score of 13.700. She told the BBC after her win:

Alice then competed in the floor final where she placed eighth after falling on her final tumble. She scored 11.666.

On 7–8 July Kinsella competed at the Heerenveen Friendly where she placed third in the team final with Great Britain, second on balance beam behind Sanne Wevers, 4th on floor, and 10th in the all-around after a fall on the beam. On 6 July Kinsella was named to the team to compete at the 2018 European Championships alongside Becky Downie, Georgia-Mae Fenton, Kelly Simm, and Lucy Stanhope. Great Britain finished fourth in team finals.

On September 27, Kinsella was named to the team to compete at the World Championships in Doha, Qatar alongside Becky Downie, Ellie Downie, Georgia-Mae Fenton, and Kelly Simm.  Great Britain finished ninth in qualifications and was the first reserve for team finals.

2019
In March Kinsella competed at the English Championships where she placed third in the all-around behind Amelie Morgan and Kelly Simm.  She was later selected to compete at the 2019 European Championships alongside Ellie Downie, Morgan, and Simm.  At the British Championships Kinsella placed fourth in the all-around, second on uneven bars, fourth on balance beam, and fifth on floor exercise.  At the European Championships Kinsella qualified to the all-around final in third place behind Angelina Melnikova and Mélanie de Jesus dos Santos.  She additionally qualified to the balance beam final in third and the floor exercise final in seventh.  In the all-around final Kinsella finished fifteenth.  During event finals she won gold on the balance beam making her the first British gymnast to become a European champion on the apparatus.  She later placed seventh in the floor exercise final.

In September Kinsella competed at the British Team Championships where she placed second in the all-around behind Kelly Simm and helped her club, Park Wreckin, place second.  Later that month Kinsella was named to the team to compete at the 2019 World Championships in Stuttgart alongside Ellie Downie, Becky Downie, Taeja James, and Georgia-Mae Fenton.  During qualifications Kinsella helped Great Britain place seventh, earning a spot in the team final and qualifying a team for Great Britain to the 2020 Olympic Games in Tokyo.  Individually she qualified to the all-around final.  During the team final she contributed scores on vault, balance beam, and floor exercise towards Great Britain's sixth place finish.  In the all-around final Kinsella finished in twelfth place.

2020–21
In early February it was announced that Kinsella was selected to represent Great Britain at the Birmingham World Cup taking place in late March. However, the Birmingham World Cup was later canceled due to the COVID-19 pandemic in the United Kingdom.

In April 2021 Kinsella was selected to represent Great Britain at the European Championships alongside Jessica Gadirova, Jennifer Gadirova (later replaced by Phoebe Jakubczyk), and Amelie Morgan.

On 7 June 2021, Kinsella was selected to represent Great Britain at the 2020 Summer Olympics alongside Jessica Gadirova, Jennifer Gadirova, and Amelie Morgan.  During qualifications Kinsella suffered multiple mishaps and did not qualify for any individual event finals; however Great Britain qualified for the team final.  During the team final Kinsella performed on all four apparatuses, hitting all of her routines and helping Great Britain win the bronze medal, their first Olympic team medal in 93 years.

In July 2021 Alice became an official ambassador for the gymnastics leotard brand Milano Pro-Sport

Outside of gymnastics, Alice was one of a number of Olympians to appear on CBBC’s Saturday Mash Up. Kinsella was gunged with 20 buckets of slime after losing a public vote.

2022
Kinsella competed at the English and British championships where she finished second and fifth respectively.  In June she was selected to represent England at the 2022 Commonwealth Games alongside Ondine Achampong, Georgia-Mae Fenton, Claudia Fragapane, and Kelly Simm.  Kinsella was also selected to compete at the European Championships alongside Achampong, Fenton, and Olympic teammates Jennifer and Jessica Gadirova.

At the Commonwealth Games Kinsella led the English team to gold during the women's team final.  Individually she qualified to the all-around, balance beam, and floor exercise finals.  During the all-around final Kinsella fell off the balance beam and suffered mistakes on floor exercise resulting in a fourth place finish.  Additionally she finished fourth in the balance beam final before going on to win gold on floor exercise.

On the first day of competition at the European Championships Kinsella won silver in the all-around behind Asia D'Amato of Italy.  Additionally, she helped Great Britain qualify for the team final in second place, and individually she qualified for the uneven bars final.  During the team final Kinsella contributed scores on all four apparatuses towards Great Britain's second place finish.  During event finals Kinsella finished eighth on uneven bars.

In September Kinsella was named to the team to compete at the 2022 World Championships, once again alongside the Gadirova twins, Achampong, and Fenton. She qualified for the All-Around final, after finishing 14th in the qualifier round.  During the team final Kinsella competed on all four apparatuses, helping Great Britain win the silver medal and achieve their highest placement at a World Championships. In the All-around final, Kinsella finished fourth, just beneath team mate Jessica Gadirova in bronze, the two highest finishes in history for a British female gymnast in a global (World or Olympic) all-around final..

Personal life 
Kinsella is the daughter of former Republic of Ireland international footballer Mark Kinsella.  Her brother Liam is also a footballer who currently plays with Walsall and has represented Ireland at under-age level.

Competitive history

References

External links
 
 
 

2001 births
Living people
British female artistic gymnasts
English female artistic gymnasts
English people of Irish descent
European champions in gymnastics
Commonwealth Games medallists in gymnastics
Commonwealth Games gold medallists for England
Commonwealth Games silver medallists for England
Commonwealth Games bronze medallists for England
Gymnasts at the 2018 Commonwealth Games
Sportspeople from Birmingham, West Midlands
Gymnasts at the 2020 Summer Olympics
Olympic gymnasts of Great Britain
Olympic medalists in gymnastics
Olympic bronze medallists for Great Britain
Olympic athletes of Great Britain
Medalists at the 2020 Summer Olympics
Medalists at the World Artistic Gymnastics Championships
Gymnasts at the 2022 Commonwealth Games
21st-century British women
Medallists at the 2018 Commonwealth Games
Medallists at the 2022 Commonwealth Games